Marie-Jeanne Bernard (20 March 1909 – 21 July 1979) was a Luxembourgian swimmer. She competed in the women's 100 metre backstroke event at the 1928 Summer Olympics.

References

External links
 

1909 births
1979 deaths
Luxembourgian female swimmers
Olympic swimmers of Luxembourg
Swimmers at the 1928 Summer Olympics
Sportspeople from Luxembourg City
Female backstroke swimmers